The R705 is a Regional Route in South Africa.

Route
Its north-western terminus is the N12 near Ritchie, Northern Cape. The route head south-east, crossing into Free State. It passes through Jacobsdal, and ends its route at an intersection with the R48, near Koffiefontein.

References 

Regional Routes in the Northern Cape
Regional Routes in the Free State (province)